Mościce is a borough of Tarnów in southern Poland.

Mościce may also refer to the following villages:
Mościce, Lubusz Voivodeship (west Poland)
Mościce, Masovian Voivodeship (east-central Poland)